Titanic Canyon is a submarine canyon located south of the Grand Banks of Newfoundland, Canada.

References

External links

Submarine canyons of the Atlantic Ocean
Canyons and gorges of Canada
Geography of Newfoundland and Labrador
RMS Titanic
Oceanography of Canada